Rick Wiles (born August 20, 1953) is a far-right American conspiracy theorist, pundit, religious extremist and senior pastor at the non-denominational Flowing Streams Church. He is the founder of TruNews; a website promoting racist, homophobic, Islamophobic, and antisemitic conspiracy theories. 

Wiles has said that Jews seek to obtain control of countries to "kill millions of Christians", and has claimed that Jews are "deceivers" and that Jews "plot, they lie, they do whatever they have to do to accomplish their political agenda". In February 2020, YouTube permanently banned the TruNews YouTube channel.

Career 
Before becoming a radio host, Wiles worked as an advertising and marketing sales manager for CNN and ESPN in the early 1980s, and in 1984 joined the Christian Broadcasting Network as their first National Cable Marketing Manager. In 1995, he was hired as the Marketing Director for Trinity Broadcasting Network. He resigned from the network in September 1998.

Wiles previously broadcast his radio show on WRMI (Radio Miami International), but has since adopted the internet as its sole platform, abandoning the short-wave broadcasting station.

TruNews 

Wiles founded the organization later to be called TruNews in September 1998, based in Dallas/Fort Worth, Texas, supposedly as a Christian ministry. During later months, Wiles toured America where he spoke of moral decline and aimed to prevent "economic collapse" and "war on American soil". On May 24, 1999, the organization, then named America's Hope, made its first broadcast. After five years of regular broadcasts, the news station changed its name to America Freedom News for a brief period. Wiles later changed it a second time to its current name, TruNews. It has also been known as Christian News Channel.

Wiles was reported by The Colorado Independent in October 2014 to have said the spread of Ebola "could solve America's problems with atheism, homosexuality, sexual promiscuity, pornography and abortion." In late January 2020, he said the coronavirus was God's "death angel" and "plagues are one of the last steps of judgment."

TruNews frequently described President Barack Obama as a "demon from hell". Obama, he claimed while the former president was in office, was the "jihadist-in-chief" who was "waging jihad against the United States from inside the White House" and murdered Supreme Court Justice Antonin Scalia as a "pagan sacrifice."

In 2017, Wiles' guests included someone who claimed President Bill Clinton is a flesh eating cannibal leading to his contraction of related diseases. Another asserted that Queen Elizabeth II of the United Kingdom is a "lizard person" who had Diana, Princess of Wales murdered because the Princess was in the process of revealing that the Royal Family was involved in satanism. He has also asserted that Israel and the "Jewish mafia" had President John F. Kennedy assassinated. Another edition of Wiles program claimed Israel and the "synagogue of Satan" are pushing the United States to fight wars on their behalf.

Wiles has asserted that the effects of Hurricane Harvey upon the city of Houston, Texas, in September 2017 resulted from Houston's "LGBT devotion;" has described Judaism and Islam as "the Antichrist"; has called Central American immigrants a "brown invasion" being used by God to punish White Americans for legal abortion; has claimed that the 2017 Las Vegas shooting was conducted by government death squads from a "gay/lesbian Nazi regime;" and, in July 2018, predicted an imminent coup (led by CNN's Anderson Cooper and MSNBC's Rachel Maddow) that would result in the nationally televised decapitation of the Trump family on the White House lawn.

TruNews is known for promoting racist and antisemitic conspiracy theories, including about the September 11 attacks in 2001. In May, Wiles said: “[9/11] wasn’t done by the Muslims. It was done by a wildcard, the Israeli Mossad, that’s cunning and ruthless and can carry out attacks on Americans and make it look like Arabs did it.” He promoted conspiracy theories of Jewish world domination while discussing the 2019 AIPAC conference. He said on TruNews in November 2019 that the congressional hearing concerning the impeachment of Donald Trump are "infested with Jews" and constitute a "Jew coup". He claimed: "That's the way the Jews work. They are deceivers. They plot, they lie, they do whatever they have to do to accomplish their political agenda" and asserted the United States would reach a state of civil war before Christmas. Millions of Christians would be murdered by Jews as a result. Of the hoax ''Protocols of the Elders of Zion',' Wiles said the authors had "accurately predicted what was going to happen in the world." TruNews and Wiles have also claimed that the transgender rights movement is a Zionist plot to make all of humanity androgynous, that this supposed plot was inspired by Talmudic and Kabbalistic doctrines, and that it involves "putting specific things in food, in drink."

Via Twitter in November 2019, TruNews said its channel had been suspended by YouTube. It was removed for violating YouTube's rules on hate speech. Wiles has denied his rhetoric has antisemitic intent: “It’s hard to say. I don’t know. I can tell you from my heart there is no ill will toward the Jewish people, with all sincerity.” He blamed George Soros for organizing a campaign against him. In late February 2020, TruNews was permanently banned from YouTube.

In March 2020, at a TruNews broadcast, Wiles claimed that the COVID-19 pandemic was God's punishment to Jews for opposing Jesus Christ and the disease spread in synagogues. Wiles also claimed that the outbreak in the United States started at the American Israel Public Affairs Committee conference in Washington, D.C. on March 2, 2020.

Wiles has claimed that the vaccines for protection against coronavirus are a plot for "global genocide" and has opposed vaccination efforts. In late May 2021, it was reported that Wiles himself had contracted COVID-19 and had been hospitalized. He said that his wife was "very fatigued," that his daughter-in-law was hospitalized, and that his grandson and other family members were suffering from coronavirus symptoms. He added that three staff members at TruNews were also ill with the virus.

The Trump administration gave Wiles's website press credentials on several occasions.

Advocating violence and mass murder 
In October 2019, Wiles stated that if Trump was defeated in the 2020 presidential election:

there is going to be violence in America. There are people in this country, veterans, cowboys, mountain men, guys that know how to fight, and they’re going to make a decision that the people that did this to Donald Trump are not going to get away with it and they’re going to hunt them down. If these people in Washington think that they are going to get away with it, it’s not going to happen. The Trump supporters are going to hunt them down. It’s going to happen and this country is going to be plunged into darkness and they brought it upon themselves because they won’t back off.

In late July 2020, Wiles urged President Trump to use “billions of hollow-point bullets” against Black Lives Matter protestors in Portland, Oregon to put down the "insurrection". He claimed the bullets were hoarded by President Obama "to round up Christians and constitutionalists under a President Hillary Clinton".

In late November 2020, after Trump's defeat was confirmed, Wiles stated that the Trump administration "plan to shoot some people". He said:
They’re going to have a bunch of traitors, they’re going to line them up against the wall, and start shooting them, because that’s what they deserve. The Democrats, the news media...If the leftists, if the scientists, professors have been working secretly with the Chinese Communist Party, then line them up against a wall and shoot them. That’s what you do with them.

COVID-19 vaccine
Rick Wiles has been spreading COVID-19 vaccine misinformation and hesitancy although misinformation is causing thousands of COVID-19 deaths in the United States weekly according to Dr Frances Collins of the National Institutes of Health.  Wiles maintains the government inserts eggs into COVID vaccine that hatch into synthetic parasites and grow inside human bodies.  This is part of a plot by "the most evil cabal in the history of mankind" to take over the world.

In June 2021, it was reported that Wiles had been admitted to hospital suffering from COVID-19.

References

External links 
 

1953 births
Living people
Alt-right writers
American conspiracy theorists
American political commentators
American talk radio hosts
American Christians
Antisemitism in the United States
Anti-Zionism in the United States
Christianity and antisemitism
Christian conspiracy theorists
Christian fundamentalists
Christian nationalists
COVID-19 conspiracy theorists
Discrimination against LGBT people in the United States
Far-right politics in the United States
People from Vero Beach, Florida